Bdellodus is an extinct genus of hybodont shark from the Early Jurassic epoch of the Jurassic Period. The name roughly translates to "Leech Tooth." Friedrich August von Quenstedt named them this due to their "coal-black" color which he associated with leeches. It is monotypic, containing only the species B. bollensis. It is known from the Toarcian of Germany. It was named on an associated dentition. It is often placed in the subfamily Acrodontinae alongside other durophagous hybodontids.

References

Early Jurassic fish
Hybodontiformes
Prehistoric cartilaginous fish genera